Odile Zink-Favaron (born May 3, 1938) is a French mathematician known for her research in graph theory, including work on well-covered graphs, factor-critical graphs, spectral graph theory, Hamiltonian decomposition, and dominating sets. She is retired from the Laboratory for Computer Science (LRI) at the University of Paris-Sud.

Favaron earned a doctorate at Paris-Sud University in 1986. Her dissertation, Stabilité, domination, irrédondance et autres paramètres de graphes [Independence, domination, irredundance, and other parameters of graphs], was supervised by Jean-Claude Bermond.

Personal life
Her father was poet and professor . Michel Zink and Anne Zink are her siblings.

References

French mathematicians
Women mathematicians
Graph theorists
Paris-Sud University alumni
1938 births
Living people